The Northern Advocate is the regional daily paper for the city of Whangārei and the Northland Region in New Zealand.

History
The Whangarei Comet and Northern Advertiser was founded in 1875 as a weekly paper by George Alderton and, despite a small population which led to a prediction the paper "would go up like a comet, and come down like a stick", the paper flourished and within two years had expanded to 12 pages and become the Northern Advocate and General Advertiser, with a small section printed in Māori. The paper began daily publication in 1902. On Monday, 23 April 2012, the weekday Northern Advocate changed to tabloid format.

Other publications

The Whangarei Report
The Whangarei Report is a weekly tabloid-format community paper, delivered free on Thursdays to all homes south of the Brynderwyns, across to Dargaville and north to Oakura, Northland.

The Northland Age
The Northland Age is a twice-weekly broadsheet community paper, delivered free on Tuesdays and Thursdays to all retailers and homes in Kerikeri, the Bay of Islands area down to Moerewa in the south.

References

External links
 The Northern Advocate website

Newspapers published in New Zealand
Northland Region
Publications established in 1875
Mass media in Whangārei
New Zealand Media and Entertainment
1875 establishments in New Zealand